Athrips peteri is a moth of the family Gelechiidae. It is found in Kazakhstan and China (Inner Mongolia).

The wingspan is about 15 mm. The forewings are covered with light grey, brown-tipped scales. There are indistinct dark spots at one-third and two-thirds near the posterior margin. The hindwings are grey.

References

Moths described in 2005
Athrips
Moths of Asia